Werauhia luis-gomezii is a plant species in the genus Werauhia. This species is endemic to Costa Rica.

References

luis-gomezii
Endemic flora of Costa Rica